Thaiyur is a southern neighbourhood of Chennai, Tamil Nadu, India. This is primarily an agricultural village. It is also famous for the salt production. An engineering college Shree Motilal Kanhaiyalal Fomra Institute of Technology is situated in this village.

References

Villages in Chengalpattu district